Tullin is a townland near Athlone, County Westmeath, Ireland. The townland is in the civil parish of St. Mary's.

The townland stands to the north of the town, on the shores of Coosan Lough, which in turn flows into Killinure Lough. The townland is bordered by Cappankelly and Garrynafela to the east, Coosan and Creaghduff South to the west and Cornamagh to the south.

References 

Townlands of County Westmeath